Canada has a large domestic and foreign tourism industry. The second largest country in the world, Canada's incredible geographical variety is a significant tourist attractor. Much of the country's tourism is centred in the following regions: Toronto, Montreal, Quebec City, Vancouver/Whistler, Niagara Falls, Vancouver Island, Canadian Rockies, British Columbia's Okanagan Valley, Churchill, Manitoba and the National Capital Region of Ottawa-Gatineau. The large cities are known for their culture, diversity, as well as the many national parks and historic sites.

In 2012, over 16 million tourists arrived in Canada, bringing US$17.4 billion in international tourism receipts to the economy. Domestic and international tourism combined directly contributes 1% of Canada's total GDP and supports 309,000 jobs in the country.

Statistics
Most visitors arriving to Canada in 2015 came from the following countries of residence

World Heritage Sites in Canada

There are 20 World Heritage Sites in Canada, including one of the oldest, Nahanni National Park, Northwest Territories (1978), and one of the newest, the Writing-on-Stone Provincial Park, Alberta (2019). Of these 20 sites, 9 are Cultural Heritages and 10 are Natural Heritages. One (Pimachiowin Aki) is a combined site.

Canada's provinces and territories

British Columbia

British Columbia is Canada's westernmost province and touches the Pacific Ocean. The winters in the coastal areas are relatively warm in comparison to the rest of Canada. British Columbia is divided into 6 regions:
Vancouver, Coast & Mountains
Thompson Okanagan
Cariboo Coast Chilcotin
Northern British Columbia
Kootenay Rockies
Vancouver Island

British Columbia is Canada's most mountainous province and has some of the most spectacular mountain scenery in the world. Alpine skiing is a major draw for the province. The province has about 33 large ski resorts spread out from Vancouver Island to the Alberta border. Whistler, British Columbia, nestled in the rugged Coast Mountains, is consistently ranked as the #1 ski resort destination in North America and co-hosted the 2010 Winter Olympic Games.

Vancouver, the largest Canadian metropolitan area west of Toronto, is one of Canada's most multi-cultural cities. There is a large community of people of Asian origin. Vancouver is a harbour city and provides beautiful landscapes of mountains and ocean.

Sites of interest in Vancouver

 Capilano Suspension Bridge, a  bridge 70 m above the Capilano River
 Stanley Park, a large forested park near downtown, the largest city owned park in Canada. Eight million visitors each year.
 Granville Island, a small island near downtown with a public market, marina, shopping and theatres.
 Chinatown, Vancouver, one of the largest in North America.
 Robson Street, a bustling upscale shopping district with a good selection of restaurants.
 Gastown, a mix of tourist-oriented businesses, restaurants and nightclubs.
 Vancouver Art Gallery
 Vancouver Maritime Museum
 Museum of Anthropology at UBC
 Vancouver Museum
 Science World at Telus World of Science

Vancouver is home to the
BC Lions, Canadian Football League
Vancouver Canucks, National Hockey League
Vancouver Whitecaps FC, Major League Soccer

Victoria, British Columbia, located on scenic Vancouver Island, is a major Canadian tourist destination attracting millions of visitors each year. Popular activities for tourists are whale watching, enjoying the busking in the inner harbour area and visiting world-famous Butchart Gardens.

Long Beach (Pacific Rim National Park) and the communities of Tofino and Ucluelet are popular tourist areas. Tofino, a town of only a few thousand, hosts more than one million visitors each year. Many new resorts are being built in the area to accommodate surfers, beach lovers, storm watchers and golfers.

Whale watching is common along the coastal areas of British Columbia as is Pacific storm watching along the west coast of Vancouver Island during the winter months.

Wine tours are common in the Okanagan Valley, British Columbia's wine and orchard country. The Okanagan Valley area has some of the best beaches and warmest summer temperatures in Canada, as well as Canada's only hot desert around the town of Osoyoos. There are 53 golf courses and two major ski resorts in the valley.

British Columbia is also a popular location for the production of many Hollywood films; it is the third largest film centre in North America only trailing California and New York.

Alberta

Alberta is a province in Canada's western prairies next to the Rocky Mountains. Its two major cities are Calgary and Edmonton, the province's capital. Edmonton is well known for West Edmonton Mall, the largest shopping mall in North America, formerly the largest in the world. Edmonton is also known as Canada's festival city, with over 60 festivals happening year round. Edmonton is home to the area of Old Strathcona, a historical district with boutique shopping, music, arts, and many restaurants. Calgary is famous for the Calgary Stampede, the world's largest rodeo and one of the biggest open air events worldwide attracting up to 1.5 million visitors every year.

Another world-class attraction is the Royal Tyrrell Museum of Palaeontology in Drumheller, home to 5 Guinness World Records due to its unique collection of dinosaur fossils including the longest-necked animal's skeleton in the world. Alberta also contains significant natural scenery, including six of Canada's twenty UNESCO World Heritage Sites. These are Banff and Jasper National Parks, Waterton-Glacier International Peace Park, Wood Buffalo National Park, Dinosaur Provincial Park, Head-Smashed-In Buffalo Jump and Writing-on-Stone Provincial Park. In the southeast, Alberta shares with Saskatchewan the Cypress Hills Interprovincial Park, a geographic region of importance both to Indigenous history and to the North-West Mounted Police.

Alberta is an important skiing destination for tourists. It has several world-class ski resorts. Canada Olympic Park, with its downhill ski and ski jumping facilities, is located in the city of Calgary.

Saskatchewan

Saskatchewan offers two major cities, Regina and Saskatoon. Regina is home to the Royal Canadian Mounted Police (RCMP) Academy at Depot Division where visitors can view the Sergeant Major's Parade held weekdays and the seasonal Sunset Retreat Ceremonies. Regina is also home to the RCMP Heritage Centre, which opened in May 2007. Saskatoon is home to the largest branch of the Western Development Museum, which houses important artifacts and recreations of the early settlement of the Canadian prairies.

The prairie province also has the most golf courses and water bodies per capita of any other province. Statistically the warmest summers with the most sunlight hours in Canada occur in Saskatoon. Natural attractions include Cypress Hills Provincial Park, the Great Sand Hills, and Scottie the Dinosaur (the largest intact Tyrannosaurus rex found in North America).

Saskatoon also has many famous attractions, such as the Remai Modern art museum located on the river bank, and the city is also home to the Western Development Museum.

Manitoba
Manitoba is home to many lakes and rivers with over 14.5% of the land area covered by lakes. This offers many opportunities for outdoor recreation, hunting, fishing, boating, and some of the finest beaches in North America, including Grand Beach, Victoria Beach and Winnipeg Beach. The province is a four-season travel destination offering cross-country and downhill skiing opportunities, as well as many miles of groomed ski-doo trails. Winnipeg, the province's capital, offers every season a world class skating trail. Using the Red River and the Assiniboine River, Winnipeg has created the world's longest skating trail since 2008, including the all-time record. Churchill on the Hudson Bay is a popular attraction due to the large polar bear and beluga whale populations.

As the capital city, Winnipeg, with a population of near 815,000, offers many cultural and artistic events, museums and year-round festivals. Brandon, Manitoba is a city of 56,000. Other cities with more than 10,000 people are Steinbach, Thompson, Portage la Prairie, Selkirk and Winkler. Winnipeg has one of the best architectural settings in Canada. Half of its downtown consists of high-rise buildings from 1880 to 1920. It also has the famous Exchange District, which is known as North America's best collection of architecture wonders. Setting from 1850 to 1920 the area of 56 square blocks has kept 95% of its historical buildings. Giving the tourist setting as they are walking in what Winnipeg looked like in 1920.

Sites of interest in Winnipeg

 Assiniboine Park and Zoo
 Canadian Museum for Human Rights
 Costume Museum of Canada
 Fort Gibraltar
 La Maison Gabrielle Roy
 Le Musée de Saint-Boniface Museum
 Dalnavert Museum
 Louis Riel statue near the Manitoba legislative building. See a figure of Manitoba's leadership.
 Manitoba Children's Museum
 Manitoba Museum
 Naval Museum of Manitoba
 Royal Canadian Mint
 The Exchange District 
 Fire Fighters Museum
 Transcona Historical Museum
 The Forks
 Upper Fort Garry
 Western Canada Aviation Museum
 Winnipeg Art Gallery
 Winnipeg Railway Museum

Winnipeg is also home to:

 Winnipeg Blue Bombers of the Canadian Football League
 Winnipeg Jets Of the National Hockey League
 Winnipeg Goldeyes of the baseball American Association
Manitoba Moose of the American Hockey League

Other sites of interest in the province

 Canadian Fossil Discovery Centre in Morden
 Commonwealth Air Training Plan Museum in Brandon
 Lower Fort Garry in St. Andrews
 Manitoba Agricultural Museum in Austin
 Manitoba Amateur Radio Museum in Austin
 Manitoba Antique Automobile Museum in Elkhorn
 Marine Museum of Manitoba in Selkirk
 Mennonite Heritage Village in Steinbach
 New Iceland Heritage Museum in Gimli
 Oak Hammock Marsh in Stonewall
 Sam Waller Museum in The Pas

Festivals and events

 Festival du Voyageur held every February in Winnipeg
 Folklorama held annually every August in Winnipeg. Folklorama is the world's largest multicultural festival. It is a 17-day festival held annually in August with close to 100 different cultural pavilions performing 3–4 shows per night.
 Jazz Winnipeg Festival
 Red River Exhibition held annually late June in Winnipeg
 Winnipeg Fringe Theatre Festival
 Winnipeg International Writers Festival
 Winnipeg Music Festival
 Winnipeg Folk Festival

Major parks of interest

 Birds Hill Provincial Park
 Duck Mountain Provincial Park
 Hecla Provincial Park
 Riding Mountain National Park,
 Spruce Woods Provincial Park, home to the Carbery Desert
 Whiteshell Provincial Park

Ontario

Ontario is the most populous and second largest province in Canada. Southern Ontario is home to the nation's capital, Ottawa, and Canada's largest city, Toronto, which is the provincial capital and one of the most multicultural cities in the world. The forests and numerous lakes of central Ontario and northern Ontario also provide popular hiking and camping destinations.

Sites of interest in Ottawa

 List of attractions in Ottawa
 ByWard Market
 Canada Agriculture Museum
 Canadian War Museum
 Canadian Aviation Museum
 Canadian Museum of Nature
 Canadian Museum of History
 Canadian Museum of Science and Technology
 Canadian Tire Centre
 Chateau Laurier
 National Art Gallery
 National War Memorial (Canada)
 Parliament Hill
 Rideau Canal
 TD Place Stadium

Sites of interest in Toronto

 List of attractions in Toronto
 Scotiabank Arena
 Art Gallery of Ontario
 Bata Shoe Museum
 Casa Loma
 CN Tower
 Fort York
 Hockey Hall of Fame
 Kensington Market
 Little Canada
 Ontario Place
 Ontario Science Centre
 Queen Street West
 Rogers Centre (formerly SkyDome)
 Royal Ontario Museum
 St. Lawrence Market
 Toronto Eaton Centre
 Toronto Islands
 Toronto Zoo
 See also: Hotels in Toronto

Other sites of interest in Ontario

 List of attractions in Hamilton, Ontario
 Algonquin Park
 Canada's Wonderland
 Ontario Tourist Routes
 Fallsview Indoor Water Park, an indoor park in Niagara Falls, Ontario
 Fort Henry
 Niagara Falls
 Niagara-on-the-Lake
 Marineland
 Muskoka Lakes
 Kingston's Old Town
 Pelee Island
 Science North and Dynamic Earth in Sudbury, Ontario
 Shaw Festival in Niagara-on-the-Lake
 Stratford Festival
 The Thousand Islands
 Upper Canada Village

Quebec

Quebec, a majority francophone province, is a major tourist draw. Quebec City is a taste of old France in the new world and a UNESCO World Heritage site. Montreal, the second largest francophone city in the world, has several tourist attractions.

Sites of interest in Montreal

 Olympic Stadium
 Juste pour rire
 Old Montreal
 Festival International de Jazz de Montréal
 Opéra de Montréal
 Montreal Museum of Fine Arts
 McCord Museum
 Crescent Street
 St. Lawrence Boulevard
 Canadian Grand Prix
 McGill University
 Mount Royal
 Parc Jean-Drapeau
 Underground city, Montreal
 Biosphère
 Redpath Museum
 Canadian Centre for Architecture
 La Ronde
 Saint Joseph's Oratory
 Underground City

Sites of interest in Quebec City

 Musée national des beaux-arts du Québec
 Musée de la civilisation
 Musée de l'Amérique française
 Espace Félix Leclerc
 Musée naval de Québec
 Choco-Musée Erico
 Musée des Ursulines de Québec
 Musée du Royal 22e Régiment/La Citadelle de Québec
 Musée de l'Abeille
 Plains of Abraham Exhibition Centre
 Parc Aquarium du Québec
 Jardin zoologique du Québec
 Château Frontenac

Sites of interest in Maritime Quebec
 Percé Rock
 Route Verte
 Cross of Gaspé
 Miguasha Provincial Park

Other sites of interest in Quebec
 Canyon Sainte-Anne

New Brunswick

New Brunswick is renowned for its sandy beaches especially along the Northumberland Strait, which in summer has the warmest water north of Virginia.

Saint John, a large city in New Brunswick and the oldest incorporated in Canada, sits at the mouth of the Saint John River. It is steeped with history, from the Irish immigration to a great fire in the 1877. The port city has numerous Victorian houses and 18th- and 19th-century architecture in the uptown area. The Saint John port welcomes close to 80 cruise ships a year with sites including:
The Bay of Fundy
Saint John River
Partridge Island
Reversing Falls
Market Square
Saints Rest Beach
New Brunswick Museum
Saint John Jewish Historical Museum
Prince William Street

Moncton, the province's largest city and recreational centre, has the following tourist attractions:
Magnetic Hill Zoo
Magnetic Hill
Casino New Brunswick
Magic Mountain
Tidal bore, twice daily on Petitcodiac River

Fredericton, the province's capital and third largest city, is a cultural and educational centre, housing the University of New Brunswick and St. Thomas University, and is filled with neighbourhoods featuring large Victorian-style homes. Other attractions at Fredericton include:
Hopewell Rocks
Cape Enrage
Kouchibouguac National Park
Fundy National Park
New Brunswick Potato Museum
Whale watching and the Confederation Bridge to Prince Edward Island are also draws.

Prince Edward Island

Prince Edward Island is the birthplace of Lucy Maud Montgomery's character, Anne of Green Gables, and a recreation of her literary home, Green Gables Farm, serves as a museum to the character. The island is also famous around the world for its potato farms and rich red sand beaches.

Other tourists attractions in Prince Edward Island include, among others:

 Victoria Row, a Victorian era street lined with restaurants, cafes and galleries, in the island's capital, Charlottetown
 West Point Lighthouse, the first lighthouse built on the island, which also serves as a museum and hotel
 Confederation Bridge, the longest bridge in the world crossing ice-covered water; spanning , the bridge connects the island to the rest of Canada

Newfoundland and Labrador

Newfoundland and Labrador attracts many tourists because of its icebergs and fjords. It was settled by Leif Ericsson, an Icelandic sailor, in 1000 A.D. Remains of this settlement can still be found in L'Anse aux Meadows, northern Newfoundland. Europeans settled in 1497, headed by an expedition by John Cabot.

The province's capital, St. John's, is the oldest city in North America, founded in 1497 by John Cabot. It contains many historical locations, such as Cabot Tower, receiver of the first wireless trans-Atlantic message in 1901. Steeped in a long, proud history and home to a rich, unique culture, St. John's residents are known for their hospitality, and their city is a major travel destination in Newfoundland both domestically and for foreign travellers. In recent years, St. John's has become a popular stop for cruise ships originating from ports in Canada, the United States and Europe. The cruise industry has brought tens of thousands of tourists to the St. John's area. In the city's downtown core, George Street, renowned for its nightlife, is home to the most bars and pubs per square foot in North America.

Just outside St. John's lies Cape Spear, the most eastern point in North America. From this point, London in the UK is closer than Vancouver.

Nova Scotia

Nova Scotia is known for its lovely scenery; most renowned is the Cape Breton Highlands. The historic 18th-century Fortress Louisbourg is also a major draw.

Halifax, the provincial capital, has several major attractions, such as the Pier 21 museum, Citadel Hill, and the Public Gardens. The Halifax Metro Centre is home to numerous events both sport-related and otherwise, such as the Nova Scotia International Tattoo. Downtown Halifax is considered the prime tourism district in Halifax, with most historic attractions located here as well as the waterfront harbourwalk, a continuous  stretch of boardwalk home to street vendors, entertainers, the Casino Nova Scotia, and the Maritime Museum of the Atlantic. Downtown Halifax is also the location of several major hotels.

Yukon Territory
With its history of the Klondike Gold Rush, First Nations culture and spectacular wilderness, the Yukon Territory has an extensive tourism industry, welcoming over 300,000 visitors a year. Tourist attractions include the gold rush town of Dawson City, Kluane National Park and Reserve and a number of attractions in Whitehorse and other communities. Opportunities for wilderness adventure tourism and ecotourism abound (hiking, canoeing, kayaking, skiing, dog-sledding), but the territory is also served by a well-developed road network, with most places accessible by road.

Watson Lake Sign Post Forest makes its home in Watson Lake, Yukon Territory. It was first settled by a U.S. soldier who repaired road signs and added his home sign of Illinois. Now this is home to over 77,000 different road signs.

Northwest Territories
Northwest Territories attractions include:
 Aurora Borealis
 Northern Life Museum
 N.W.T. Mining Heritage Society
 Wood Buffalo National Park
 Tuktut Nogait National Park
 Nahanni National Park Reserve
 South Nahanni River
 Canol Heritage Trail
 Aulavik National Park
 Coppermine River
 Mackenzie River

Nunavut Territory

Nunavut is probably the most expensive of all the tourist destinations in Canada. Attractions in Nunavut include:
 Auyuittuq National Park
 Quttinirpaaq National Park
 Sirmilik National Park
 Ukkusiksalik National Park
 Ovayok Territorial Park

Neighbouring countries
 Canada shares the world's longest undefended border with the United States.
 A marine border is shared with both Greenland (a Danish territory) and Saint-Pierre and Miquelon (a French overseas collectivity).

See also

 Visa policy of Canada
 Canadian Tourism Commission
 List of hotels in Canada

References

External links

 Canadian Tourism Commission (Official Government Website)

 
Canada